Sarah Spiegel may refer to:
 Sarah Spiegel (biologist)
 Sarah Spiegel (singer)